Akula is the Russian word for shark. It may refer to:

 , Щука-Б or Shchuka-B in Russian
 , Акула or Akula in Russian
 , a submarine built for the Imperial Russian Navy
 Oksana Pochepa (born 1984), stage name Akula, Russian pop singer and model
 Kaula in Kashmir Shaivism.

Akula is an Indian family name: There are some people with this name.

 Akula Rajender is an Indian politician belonging to Indian National Congress.
 Akula Satyanarayana is a member of the Bharatiya Janata Party from Andhra Pradesh. 

Indian surnames
Telugu-language surnames